Anthony (or Tony) Gonzalez (or Gonzales) may refer to:

Anthony Gonzalez (actor) (born 2004), American actor
Anthony Gonzalez (politician) (born 1984), American politician from Ohio and former football wide receiver
Anthony Gonzalez (musician) (born 1980), French musician and creator of M83
Tony Gonzalez (born 1976), former American football tight end
Tony González (baseball) (born 1936), former Major League Baseball outfielder
Tony Gonzales (born 1980), American politician from Texas

See also
Antonio González (disambiguation)
Mark Anthony Gonzalez (born 1994), Canadian soccer player